Within and Without is the debut studio album by American singer Washed Out, released on July 6, 2011 by Sub Pop. The album debuted at number 26 on the Billboard 200 with first-week sales of 15,000 copies, and by July 2013, it had sold 89,000 copies in the United States.

Artwork
The cover for Within and Without uses an image that also appeared in the May 2011 issue of Cosmopolitan magazine, accompanying an article titled "Is This the Most Satisfying Sex Position?". Washed Out told Exclaim!, "We licensed the image from the photographer Martien Mulder from New York. I had seen the image in this avant-garde photography magazine while we were on tour in Australia and it was just an ad for one of her exhibitions. I loved it for a lot of different reasons. When we licensed it we thought we had exclusive rights to it and then a month later she licensed it again to Cosmopolitan." He also stated he was disappointed to see the photo used in an article on sexual positions, "mainly because it undercut all of my ideas about what the image represented and what the album represented", as he felt "it wasn't sexual at all and it wasn't supposed to be provocative."

Critical reception

Within and Without received generally positive reviews from music critics. At Metacritic, which assigns a normalized rating out of 100 to reviews from mainstream publications, the album received an average score of 70, based on 34 reviews.

Kevin Liedel of Slant Magazine praised its juxtaposition of "warm, decades-old retrograde styles with the despondent, isolated, and decidedly modern mood of [Ernest] Greene's alienated narratives ... Melodies and instrumentation are infused with sunny, tender basslines and mellow synths that harken back to soft, '70s-era R&B rhythms, electrified '80s pop, and synth-heavy shoegaze, while Greene's muffled vocals and haunting atmospherics provide angst-ridden counterpoints." Brandon Soderberg of Pitchfork noted the album's improved production values compared to Greene's previous output, and called it a "declaration to snarky ironists that there is nothing to be ashamed of" about the chillwave genre.

However, Paul Lester of BBC Music gave the album a mixed review, stating: "The rhythm is repetitive but sounds played rather than sequenced, offering the idea that Within and Without is less synthetic, more 'real', an unnecessary development considering how moving those early Washed Out tunes were, while production-wise the new material is actually a less punchy version of Greene's pristine melancholia, more waffly and wan."

Track listing

Personnel
Credits adapted from the liner notes of Within and Without.

 Ernest Greene – art direction, production
 Ben H. Allen – bass guitar, mixing, percussion, production
 Mark Cobb – rototoms 
 Bradley Hagen – drums 
 Jeff Kleinsmith – art direction, design

 John Maskew – recording
 Heather McIntosh – cello 
 Martien Mulder – photos 
 Caroline Polachek – vocals 
 Rob Skipworth – recording

Charts

Release history

References

2011 debut albums
Sub Pop albums
Washed Out albums